Angela Desveaux is a Canadian singer-songwriter, based in Montreal, Quebec, whose style blends a diverse mix of pop, rock and country influences.

Background
Raised on Cape Breton Island, Desveaux later moved to Montreal and began performing as a vocalist with local country and folk bands, and released a self-titled independent album in 2005. She subsequently met Howard Bilerman, a producer and musician associated with Arcade Fire, who helped her to assemble a band and to record her 2006 album Wandering Eyes.

She released her third album, The Mighty Ship, in 2008.

Desveaux's supporting band currently consists of Julie Doiron on guitar, Eric Digras on bass and Gilles Castilloux on drums.

Discography
Angela Desveaux (2005)
Wandering Eyes (2006)
The Mighty Ship (2008)

References

Living people
Canadian women singer-songwriters
Canadian singer-songwriters
Canadian women rock singers
Singers from Montreal
Canadian women pop singers
Place of birth missing (living people)
Year of birth missing (living people)